Times of Our Lives may refer to:

Times of Our Lives (video), a video of Ocean Colour Scene's 1997 performance at the Royal Albert Hall
Times of Our Lives (Judy Collins album), a 1982 album by Judy Collins